The 2012 North Ayrshire Council election took place on 3 May 2012 to elect members of North Ayrshire Council. The election used the eight wards created as a result of the Local Governance (Scotland) Act 2004, with each ward electing three or four Councillors using the single transferable vote system form of proportional representation, with 30 Councillors being elected.

The election saw the Scottish National Party make further advances by gaining 4 seats to become the largest party on the Council while also increasing their vote share significantly. The Scottish Labour Party lost 1 seat to become the second largest party on the Council. Independents gained a seat to have a total of 6 members. The Scottish Conservative and Unionist Party lost two-thirds of their former seats while the Scottish Liberal Democrats were wiped out, losing both seats.

Following the election the SNP formed a minority administration on the Council. This replaced the previous Labour minority administration which existed from 2007 to 2012. This is also the first time that Labour has not been part of the administration of this Council for over 30 years.

Election result

Note: "Votes" are the first preference votes. The net gain/loss and percentage changes relate to the result of the previous Scottish local elections on 3 May 2007. This may differ from other published sources showing gain/loss relative to seats held at dissolution of Scotland's councils.

Ward results

Irvine West
2007: 2xLab; 1xSNP; 1xCon
2012: 2xLab; 2xSNP
2007-2012: SNP gain one seat from Con

Irvine East
2007: 2xLab; 1xSNP; 1xLib Dem
2012: 2xSNP; 2xLab
2007-2012 Change: SNP gain one seat from Lib Dem

Kilwinning
2007: 2xLab; 1xSNP; 1xLib Dem
2012: 2xLab; 1xSNP; 1xIndependent
2007-2012 Change: Independent gain from Lib Dem

Saltcoats and Stevenston
2007: 2xLab; 1xSNP; 1xIndependent
2012: 2xLab; 1xSNP; 1xIndependent
2007-2012 Change: No change

Ardrossan and Arran
2007: 2xIndependent; 1xSNP; 1xLab
2012: 2xSNP; 1xIndependent; 1xLab
2007-2012 Change: SNP gain one seat from Independent

Dalry and West Kilbride
2007: 1xIndependent; 1xLab; 1xCon
2012: 2xIndependent; 1xSNP
2007-2012 Change:  Independent and SNP gain one seat from Con and Lab

Kilbirnie and Beith
2007: 1xSNP; 1xLab; 1xIndependent
2012: 1xSNP; 1xIndependent; 1xLab
2007-2012 Change: No change

North Coast and Cumbraes
2007: 2xSNP; 1xLab; 1xCon
2012: 2xSNP; 1xLab; 1xCon
2007-2012 Change: No change

Post-Election Changes
† North Coast and Cumbraes SNP Cllr Alex McLean died on 1 August 2014. A by-election was held on 30 October 2014 and was won by his widow Grace McLean, also of the SNP.
†† Irvine West SNP Cllr Ruth Maguire was elected as a MSP for Cunninghame South at the 2016 Scottish Parliament election. She resigned her Council seat on 25 May 2016 and a by-election was held on 11 August 2016 which was won by Labour's Louise McPhater.

By-Elections

References 

2012
2012 Scottish local elections